The Blepharoneurinae are a subfamily of the fruit fly family Tephritidae comprising five genera and 34 species.

Genera
 Baryglossa
 Blepharoneura
 Ceratodacus
 Hexaptilona
 Problepharoneura

See also
Ceratodacus priscus

References

External links 
 Diptera.info - Tephritidae Photo Album

 
Brachycera subfamilies